TKC Strawberry Arena is an arena in Kanuma, Tochigi, Japan. It is the practice facilities of the Link Tochigi Brex of the B.League, Japan's professional basketball league.

References

Basketball venues in Japan
Indoor arenas in Japan
Utsunomiya Brex
Sports venues in Tochigi Prefecture